Next of Kin is a 1982 Australian psychological horror film co-written and directed by Tony Williams, and starring Jackie Kerin and John Jarratt.

The film was featured in the documentary Not Quite Hollywood where it was praised by Quentin Tarantino.

Plot
After her estranged mother's death, Linda Stevens inherits a rural estate called Montclare, which has been in her family for years. The rambling structure houses a long-held retirement community for the elderly. The night Linda arrives, a new boarder, the aged Mrs. Ryan, also arrives during a rainstorm, dropped off by her son, Kelvin. Shortly after Linda settles in, a resident of the home is found drowned in a bathtub. Linda begins reading childhood diaries left in the house by her mother, in which her mother describes being unsettled in the home and believing someone is watching her. She also finds handwritten medical records for her aunt Rita, which disturbs her as she was told that Rita had been dead at the time they were written.

Meanwhile, Linda rekindles her romance with Barney, a man whom she was romantic with years prior. After the two go on a date together, Linda returns to Montclare, where Connie, a longtime employee, notifies her that Lance, another resident, has suffered a debilitating stroke. Later, Linda informs Dr. Barton, the resident physician of Montclare, that she is considering selling the property.

After a series of unusual incidents, Linda comes to suspect that her aunt Rita may still be alive and stalking the house, though Dr. Barton assures her that Rita died in a psychiatric care facility years prior. Upon further delving into her mother's diaries, Linda finds that there is a precedent for mysterious deaths in the retirement community, particularly an inordinate number of drowning deaths. Convinced that Dr. Barton and Connie are murdering residents, Linda flees to town on foot and locates Barney in a panic.

Barney escorts Linda back to the Montclare, and enters the house to obtain the diaries for Linda. In a fountain in yard, Linda finds Carol, a romantic rival previously introduced, with her throat slashed. Linda flees into the house in search of Barney, only to find him also murdered. Upstairs, Linda finds Lance, conscious and able to walk. Linda ushers him outside through a window onto an emergency escape stairway. Linda is soon confronted by Mrs. Ryan, who is in fact Linda's aunt Rita, seeking vengeance against Linda's mother, whom Rita claims was integral in having her placed in a psychiatric institution; Rita claims that it was Linda's mother who was in fact insane. A crazed Kelvin—Rita's son (and Linda's cousin)—enters the room and attacks Linda with a sledgehammer.

Linda manages to barricade herself in a bathroom, where she finds Dr. Barton's and Connie's bloodied corpses in the bathtub. Linda stabs Rita through the eye with the sharp handle of a comb as Rita peers through the door lock, and then flees downstairs, escaping by car. She arrives at the local diner nearby, where the owner's young son, Nico, is alone. The two barricade themselves in the diner, but Kelvin arrives, driving his truck through the side of the building. Using a shotgun, Linda manages to shoot and kill Kelvin. At dawn, the two drive away as the diner becomes engulfed in flames, ignited by the petrol leaking from Kelvin's damaged truck.

Cast

Reception

On Rotten Tomatoes the film has an approval rating of 100% based on reviews from 6 critics.

The film's pacing and atmosphere have been compared to that of Stanley Kubrick's The Shining by Quentin Tarantino.

Accolades

References

External links 
 
 Next of Kin at Australian Screen Online
 Next of Kin at Oz Movies

1982 films
1980s slasher films
Australian ghost films
Australian horror films
Australian slasher films
1982 horror films
1980s supernatural horror films
Australian mystery films
Australian supernatural horror films
1980s English-language films
Films set in country houses